Lambda Serpentis, Latinized from λ Serpentis, is a star in the constellation Serpens, in its head (Serpens Caput). It has an apparent visual magnitude of 4.43, making it visible to the naked eye. Lambda Serpentis is moving toward the Solar System with a radial velocity of 66.4 km s−1.

This star is 6% larger and 14% more massive than the Sun, although it has a similar stellar classification. It is shining with nearly double the Sun's luminosity and this energy is being radiated from the star's outer atmosphere at an effective temperature of 5,884 K. A periodicity of 1837 days (5.03 years) was suspected by Morbey & Griffith (1987), but it is probably bound to stellar activity. However, McDonald Observatory team has set limits to the presence of one or more exoplanets around Lambda Serpentis with masses between 0.16 and 2 Jupiter masses and average separations spanning between 0.05 and 5.2 Astronomical Units.

Planetary system
In 2020, a candidate planet was detected orbiting Lambda Serpentis (HD 141004). With a minimum mass of 0.043  (13.6 ) and an orbital period of 15 days, this would most likely be a hot Neptune. The discovery of planet was confirmed in 2021.

References

Further reading

G-type main-sequence stars
Serpentis, Lambda
Suspected variables
Planetary systems with one confirmed planet

Serpens (constellation)
J15462661+0721109
Serpentis, Lambda
BD+7 3023
Serpentis, 27
141004
077257
5868